The following is a list of telenovelas produced by Canal 13.

1980s

1990s

2000s

2010s

See also 
 Canal 13 (Chile)
 List of Televisión Nacional de Chile telenovelas

References 

Channel 13
 
Canal 13 telenovelas